Hines is an unincorporated community in Dixie County, Florida. Prince Benjamin Oliver Sr., a long serving educator of African American descent, taught there early in his career. Hines is located in a remote and largely undeveloped area of the state along County Road 357 south of Steinhatchee Conservation Area and north of Cross City, Florida and U.S. Route 98 in Florida / U.S. 19.

References

Unincorporated communities in Dixie County, Florida